Lynx Rocks is a group of rocks in southwestern Hero Bay on the north side of Livingston Island in the South Shetland Islands, Antarctica.  The area was visited by early 19th century sealers operating from nearby Blythe Bay.

The feature is named after the Australian sealing vessel Lynx under Captain Richard Siddins that visited the South Shetland in 1820-21 and 1821–22, wintering in the Falkland Islands in 1821.

Location

See also 
 Composite Antarctic Gazetteer
 List of Antarctic islands south of 60° S
 SCAR
 Territorial claims in Antarctica

Maps
 L.L. Ivanov. Antarctica: Livingston Island and Greenwich, Robert, Snow and Smith Islands. Scale 1:120000 topographic map.  Troyan: Manfred Wörner Foundation, 2009.

References

External links
Composite Antarctic Gazetteer.

Rock formations of Livingston Island